Valeria Rossi (born 7 March 1969) is an Italian singer and songwriter. She is most famous for the song , a huge summer hit of 2001 and the second biggest-selling single of the year in Italy.

Discography

Albums 
 2001: Ricordatevi dei fiori
 2004: Osservi l'aria

Singles 
 2001: "Tre parole"
 2001: "Tutto fa l'amore"
 2002: "Tutte le mattine"
 2002: "Pensavo a te"
 2003: "Luna di lana"
 2004: "Ti dirò"

 Collaborations
 2011: "Il tempo che non c'è" (Il Migno feat. Valeria Rossi)

References

External links 
 \
 
 Valeria Rossi – Tre Parole (2001)

Italian singer-songwriters
Italian pop singers
1969 births
People from Tripoli, Libya
Libyan people of Italian descent
Living people
Sanremo Music Festival
Libyan emigrants to Italy

es:Valeria Rossi#top